S Pictoris is a Mira variable-type star in the constellation Pictor. It ranges between apparent magnitude 6.5 and 14.0, and spectral types M6.5e to M8III-IIe, over a period of 422 days.

References 

Durchmusterung objects
033894
024126
Pictoris, S
Pictor (constellation)
M-type giants
Mira variables